Soul UK is the seventh studio album by English singer-songwriter Beverley Knight. The album was released on 4 July 2011, and features covers of British soul songs that inspired her whilst growing up. The album includes a live DVD of the tracks, filmed on 7 April at the Porchester Hall in London.

Background
In the press release for Soul UK, Knight explained her choice to make and release an album of cover versions. She stated "I gave a lot of thought to choosing the songs I wanted to interpret for this album and it was great fun putting my own flavour and twist on tracks by some of the fantastic UK artists who preceded me and inspired me. A lot these artists opened doors for both myself and many others, and many of them are still going strong – so the album is, in part, a thank you to them. The UK is a world-beating producer of musical talent and this genre can sometimes feel overlooked and underplayed. I hope with this album that people can enjoy these songs all over again and in some cases discover them for the first time."

On her official site, Knight gave a track-by-track rundown of the album, explaining the inspiration behind recording each track that features. She introduced it by explaining, "Welcome to Soul UK, my celebration of some of the home grown artists and soulful tracks that have inspired me. Some of these artists have had enormously successful careers, others have had glimpses of success, and others have never really been given due attention and respect. All these songs, artists and writers have in various ways contributed to my own career in music, and deserve to be recognised for cutting a path that enabled me and every other British Soul/Urban act without exception to walk more easily. This is why I have made this album, it is a labour of love, and my tribute to heroes both celebrated and unsung."

The album features production from Grammy Award-winning producer Martin Terefe, who has worked with James Morrison and Jason Mraz, along with London production duo, Future Cut who have worked with both Lily Allen and Beyoncé.

Critical reception

Emery Bairns of Blues & Soul gave the album an 8 out of 10 rating.

Track listing
The full track listing was confirmed by iTunes.

Singles
Knight confirmed whilst performing at London's Porchester Hall, at the album launch show, in April 2011, that the first single from the album would be "Mama Used to Say", a cover of the Junior single, which peaked number 7 in the UK in 1982. The single was released on 27 June 2011. The second single was Knight's version of Roachford's "Cuddly Toy", released on 28 August 2011, while the third was Knight's version of George Michael's "One More Try", released on 23 October 2011.  "Round and Around", originally recorded by Jaki Graham was released as the fourth single from Soul UK on 12 February 2012.

Original artists
"Fairplay" by Soul II Soul (1988) (UK #63)
"Southern Freeez" by Freeez (1981) (UK #8)
"Mama Used to Say" by Junior (1982) (UK #7)
"Say I'm Your Number One" by Princess (1985) (UK #7)
"When You Gonna Learn" by Jamiroquai (1992) (UK #28)
"Apparently Nothin'" by Young Disciples (1991) (UK #13)
"There's Nothing Like This" by Omar (1991) (UK #14)
"Don't Be a Fool" by Loose Ends (1990) (UK #13)
"Always and Forever" by Heatwave (1977) (UK #9)
"Round and Around" by Jaki Graham (1985) (UK #9)
"Cuddly Toy" by Roachford (1988) (UK #4)
"Damn" by Lewis Taylor (1996)
"One More Try" by George Michael (1988) (UK #8)

Information lifted from the liner notes on Soul UK.

Chart performance

Soul UK – The Remixes
A remix album, entitled Soul UK – The Remixes was released exclusively on digital download via Beatport on 29 January 2012. It features remixes of Soul UK album tracks "Mama Used to Say", "Apparently Nothin'", "Cuddly Toy", "Round and Around" and "Southern Freeez".

Track listing
Digital download

References

External links
 Beverley Knight – Official web site
 Beverley Knight – Official MySpace page

2011 albums
Beverley Knight albums